Bagumbayan is one of the 28 barangays of Taguig, Metro Manila in the Philippines.

History 
During the Spanish Colonial Era, Bagumbayan was filled with forests. No one was brave enough to settle here save for the families Tanyag and Garcia, both of which came from the village of Tipas. Once they settled there, the Spanish Government established it as a barangay of Taguig. Because it was recently founded, it was named Bagong Bayan (New Town), and shortened to Bagumbayan. Its first lumang bayan (barangay head) was Cererina San Juan, and the primary jobs of the people then were fishing and farming. The next people to occupy the position of barangay head before the American Colonial Period were Tandoy Sta. Teresa, Lelay Sta. Teresa, and Cepruto Marcelo.

During the time of the Americans and the Japanese in the Philippines, Laureano Garcia became the barangay's head and was followed by Victor Padsisihan, Segundo Magundayao, Arturo Tanyag, Francisco Javier, and Nicanor Garcia. Though it was the latest town that was founded then, the citizens of Taguig trusted the following people to be its councilors: Elino Cruz, Benito Garcia, Cerilo P. Santos, Arsenio Javier, Jose Aquino, Francisco dela Rosa, Francisco Tortosa, Claudio Marcelo and Rufino Dacumos.

In 1958, the barangay was nicknamed "Sleeping Town" because the livelihood of its people advanced slowly. However, later in 1959, their livelihood was stimulated because the value of the land in the area that was normally exposed or used for agriculture suddenly increased. Because of this, the government ordered the construction of what was then called the South Superhighway, leading to an increase in land purchases by corporations. From there, Bagumbayan developed into the barangay it is now.

Taguig
Barangays of Metro Manila